North Memorial Health Hospital, sometimes referred to as North Memorial, is a 353-bed community hospital located in Robbinsdale, Minnesota. It is one of four Level I trauma centers in Minnesota. It is also a Level II trauma center for pediatrics.

Foundation
In 1939, Dr. Samuel Samuelson started Victory Hospital on property that he  already owned in Robbinsdale. It was the only medical center outside of the downtown Minneapolis/St.Paul area. Previously, hospitals in the region had only been located in downtown areas in order to be close to physician's offices. The hospital's name changed from Victory Hospital to North Memorial when it became a private hospital in 1954. In 1957, North Memorial was accredited by the Joint Commission on Accreditation of Hospitals.

Facilities
The hospital evolved from a 30-bed facility to a 518-bed medical center. It developed the first hospital-based medical transportation system involving numerous helicopters, ambulances, and support staff. Today, North Memorial Health  Hospital is a level one trauma center, accredited with awards. According to the Healthgrades website, it has been recognized as one of the top 50 hospitals in America for two years in a row. The hospital also takes pride in its work and has received the Hennepin County Wellness by Design award multiple times, which recognizes workplaces that develop, promote and maintain a healthy environment. North Memorial has also received awards for its performance in areas such as hip and knee replacements, strokes, and heart attacks. The hospital has a track record of  specialist centers, ranging from heart attacks to cancer. These specialist care centers vary in location from Twin City suburbs to western Wisconsin.

Branding
North Memorial Health Hospital hired the branding agency Brandfire in 2016 and they rolled out their new name, North Memorial Health, and branding encompassing two hospitals, clinics and specialty practices, in April 2017.

References

Hospital buildings completed in 1954
Hospitals in Minnesota
Non-profit organizations based in Minnesota
Buildings and structures in Hennepin County, Minnesota
Hospitals established in 1954
Trauma centers